Arthur L. Jones (August 23, 1924 – December 16, 2003) was an American politician in the state of South Dakota. He was a member of the South Dakota House of Representatives. He was an alumnus of South Dakota School of Mines and Technology and was a veteran of World War II. He was an investment broker.

References

1924 births
2003 deaths
Republican Party members of the South Dakota House of Representatives
20th-century American politicians